Rozo may refer to:

People
 José Alberto Rozo Gutiérrez (1937–2018), Colombian Catholic bishop
 Kevin Rozo (born 1994), American football player
 Marcelo Rozo (born 1989), Colombian golfer
 Rómulo Rozo (1899–1964), Colombian sculptor

Places
 Rozo Point, Cholet Island, Antarctica

Other
 Rozo FC, Turks and Caicos football club
 RozoFS, distributed file system